The Undying is a 2011 American supernatural romantic thriller directed by Steven Peros, written by David M. Flynn and Steven Peros, and starring Robin Weigert, Anthony Carrigan, Wes Studi, Jay O. Sanders, and Sybil Temtchine.

Plot
Dr. Barbara Haughton (Robin Weigert) discovers the farmhouse she's recently rented is inhabited by the ghost of Elijah Parmenter, a Civil War soldier.

As her interest in Elijah grows and his presence comes to dominate her dreams, she assists in emergency surgery to save Jason Donovan (Anthony Carrigan), a young stabbing victim.  Donovan’s life is saved but he's pronounced brain-dead.  After thirty days, his wife agrees to remove him from all life support systems.

As Barbara removes Donovan from the machines that are keeping him alive, she suddenly realizes that his body, no longer wanted or needed, might serve another purpose. She reconnects the body to a mobile life support gurney, brings it to the farmhouse and offers it to the ghost.

Her happiness with Elijah is short-lived when a young girl is murdered the night Barbara is away at a party.  Police Lt. Wascoe (Wes Studi) has identified a suspect as the possible killer: Jason Donovan.

Cast
 Robin Weigert as Dr. Barbara Haughton
 Anthony Carrigan as Jason Donovan / Elijah
 Wes Studi as Detective Frank Wascoe
 Jay O. Sanders as Dr. Richard Lassiter
 Sybil Temtchine as Rachel Braun
 Franklin Ojeda Smith as Henry Strawbridge
 Paul David Story as Ghost Elijah
 Paola Mendoza as Betty
 Stefanie Estes as Maragaret
 McGhee Monteith as Donna Marie

Release
After premiering at the Irish Film Institute's annual Horrorthon Film Festival, the film was released direct-to-video on December 13, 2011 by MTI Home Video and is also available via VOD and Digital Download.

References

External links
 
 The Undying, MTI Home Video

2011 films
2010s romantic thriller films
2010s thriller films
2010s supernatural films
2010s English-language films